Peshkovo is a rural locality (a village) in Sukhonskoye Rural Settlement, Mezhdurechensky District, Vologda Oblast, Russia. The population was 27 as of 2002.

Geography 
Peshkovo is located 11 km southeast of Shuyskoye (the district's administrative centre) by road. Shchipino is the nearest rural locality.

References 

Rural localities in Mezhdurechensky District, Vologda Oblast